What Now, Catherine Curtis? is a 1976 American television film directed by Charles Walters and starring Lucille Ball as Catherine Curtis, a middle-aged divorcee who holds on to life after a break in 23 years of marriage. It is broken down into three parts, titled "First Night," "First Affair" and "First Love."

Cast 
 Lucille Ball as Catherine Curtis
 Joseph Bologna as Peter
 Art Carney as Mr. Slaney

Public reception 
The special was the #16 show for the week and won its timeslot with a 22.6 rating and 36% share of the audience.

References

External links 
  What Now, Catherine Curtis? on the Internet Movie Database

1976 television specials
American television films
1970s English-language films